The THOG problem is one of cognitive psychologist Peter Wason's logic puzzles, constructed to show some of the weaknesses in human thinking.

You are shown four symbols
a black square
a white square
a black circle
a white circle
and told by the experimenter "I have picked one colour (black or white) and one shape (square or circle). A symbol that possesses exactly one, but not both, of the properties I have picked, is called a THOG. The black square is a THOG. For each of the other symbols, are they a) definitely a THOG, b) undecidable, or c) definitely not a THOG?"

Presented in this form, the task is quite difficult, because much information must be held in working memory at the same time. If the chosen symbol of the experimeter is a black square it means, it has one attribute of a Thog. If it would have both from the experimenter picked attributes, it would not be a Thog. So we know, one of the attributes is either black or square. That leaves us two possible solutions, what the experimenter could have picked as Thog attributes, black and circle or white and square because it cannot be white and circle because that would mean, that the black square could not be a Thog but it is. It also cannot be black and square that would also mean the black square could not be a Thog but it is. So black and circle or white and square are the only solutions and in both, the white circle would have an from the experimenter picked attribute, so the white circle is for sure a Thog.

References

Logic puzzles
Cognition

de:Peter Wason#THOG-Aufgabe